Hindsiclava hertleini is a species of sea snails, a marine gastropod mollusc in the family Pseudomelatomidae, the turrids and allies

Description
The length of the shell varies between 17 mm and 50 mm.

Distribution
This marine species occurs off the Galapagos Islands

References

 B. Landau and C. Marques da Silva. 2010. Early Pliocene gastropods of Cubagua, Venezuela: Taxonomy, palaeobiogeography and ecostratigraphy. Palaeontos 19:1-221

External links
 * 
 

hertleini
Gastropods described in 1969